Volontaire is a French drama directed by Hélène Fillières, who also co-wrote the film and plays a naval commander.

Plot
After studies to become a Russian and an English linguist, Laure joins the Marine Fusiliers as a protocol officer. She is assigned to work for a Naval Commando officer that inspires her to earn her own green beret as a member of the Commando Ponchardier support unit.

Cast
 Diane Rouxel as Laure Baer
 Lambert Wilson as Commandant Rivière
 Alex Descas as Albertini
 Corentin Fila as Loïc Dumont
 Josiane Balasko as Muriel Baer
 André Marcon as Monsieur Baer
 Igor Kovalsky as Marchaudon
 Jonathan Couzinié as Philippe
 Hélène Fillières as Weber
 Marc Fraize as Desmarest
 Pauline Acquart as Attab

Production
Principal photography on the film began on May 11, 2017 in Bretagne. The shooting lasted 7 weeks and ended in July 2017.

References

External links

2018 drama films
French drama films
2010s French-language films
2010s French films